Power Broker (foaled February 15, 2010) is an American Thoroughbred racehorse who won the  2012 Frontrunner Stakes.

Career

His first race was at Delmar on July 28, 2012, where he came in first.

On September 29, 2012, he won the Grade 1  Frontrunner Stakes, which was the biggest win of his career.

On October 5, 2013, in his final race, he won the Grade 2 Indiana Derby. He was retired on November 19, 2013.

Pedigree

References

2010 racehorse births
Racehorses bred in Kentucky
Racehorses trained in the United States
Thoroughbred family 8-h